The Narragansette Pier Open was a tennis tournament first established in 1885 at Narragansette Pier Courts, Narragansett, Rhode Island, United States that ran until 1909.

History
The Narragansette Pier Open was a tennis tournament first established in 1885 at the Narragansette Pier Courts, Narragansett, Rhode Island, United States. In 1894 the new Point Judith Country Club was established and took over responsibility for hosting the Narragansette Pier Open. the tournament ran until 1909.

Notable winners of the men's singles title included Walter Van Rensselaer Berry, Howard Augustus Taylor, Oliver Samuel Campbell. Quincy Shaw
Malcolm Greene Chace and John Howland

References

Defunct tennis tournaments in the United States